Blue Mountain is a mountain in British Columbia.

External links
 

Mountains of British Columbia under 1000 metres
Pacific Ranges
New Westminster Land District